Mesko is a Polish defense technology company established in 1922, operating from August 25, 1924 as Państwowa Fabryka Amunicji (National Ammunition Factory), then Zakłady Metalowe MESKO SA (Metal Factory MESKO SA). At present the company produces various munitions with headquarters in Skarżysko-Kamienna, Poland.

In the past, the factory was a manufacturer of home appliances, as in the communist period it belonged to the "Predom" union of industries. Currently part of the Polish Armaments Group (Polska Grupa Zbrojeniowa) concern, previously to the Bumar group.

Current products 
 GROM – Man-Portable Air Defense System (MANPADS)
 Piorun – MANPADS
 SPIKE-LR – Anti-Tank Guided Missile (ATGM)
 NLPR-70 – Unguided rocket for use for air-to-ground purposes
 Various small arms ammunition
 "PIRAT" ATGM
 "MOSKIT" ATGM

References

External links 
 MESKO SA – Strona oficjalna
 MESKO-ROL
 MESKO-AGD

Defence companies of Poland
Polish brands